Ilija Radović (Cyrillic: Илија Радовић; born 9 May 1985) is a Montenegrin football defender.

Club career
At the beginning of his career he was playing with hometown clubs FK Sutjeska Nikšić and FK Čelik Nikšić. His next club was FK Vojvodina where he was playing with this club in the Serbian Super Liga during the second half of the 2007–08 season. In summer 2008, he joined Hungarian side Videoton FC and played with them in the Hungarian top league in the 2008–09 and 2009–10 seasons. In summer 2010, he returned to Montenegro and signed a contract with FK Budućnost Podgorica, but the following season he rejoined his former club Sutjeska. During the winter break of the 2011–12 season, he moved to his also former club Čelik where he played with them in the following two seasons in the UEFA Europa League qualifiers and scored a goal in a match against Budapest Honvéd FC. In the 2013–14 season he moved abroad again, this time by joining Serbian Super Liga side FK Spartak Subotica. During the season 2014–15 he was part of FK Napredak Kruševac. From Napredak he went to OFK Bačka where he spent the 2015–16 season. After a couple of years spent in Serbia, he again moved to his land of birth Montenegro and signed a contract with FK Petrovac.

Honours
Nemzeti Bajnokság I, Runner-up: 1
 2010
Montenegrin First League, Runner-up: 1
 2011
Montenegrin Second League: 1
 2012
Montenegrin Cup: 1
 2012
Montenegrin Cup, Runner-up: 1
 2013

References

1985 births
Living people
Footballers from Nikšić
Association football defenders
Serbia and Montenegro footballers
Montenegrin footballers
FK Sutjeska Nikšić players
FK Čelik Nikšić players
FK Vojvodina players
Fehérvár FC players
FK Budućnost Podgorica players
FK Spartak Subotica players
FK Napredak Kruševac players
OFK Bačka players
OFK Petrovac players
FK Mornar players
First League of Serbia and Montenegro players
Serbian SuperLiga players
Nemzeti Bajnokság I players
Montenegrin First League players
Serbian First League players
Montenegrin expatriate footballers
Expatriate footballers in Hungary
Montenegrin expatriate sportspeople in Hungary
Expatriate footballers in Serbia
Montenegrin expatriate sportspeople in Serbia